Martin Jeppesen or just Jeppe (born December 29, 1970) is a Danish football player who has spent the majority of his career with Boldklubben Frem.

Jeppesens father Jørn Jeppesen made around 260 first-team appearances for Frem, scoring 99 goals. Jeppesen was said to be chasing this record.

Jeppesen is also related to Jim Voss, the former chairman of BK Frem's amateur branch.

Jeppesen retired from football in 2007, but after the BK Frem bankruptcy in 2010, joined his former club as playing assistant manager to John 'Tune' Kristiansen.

Footnotes and references

External links
 Boldklubben Frem profile

1970 births
Living people
Danish men's footballers
Danish 1st Division players
Boldklubben Frem players
Herfølge Boldklub players
Association football forwards